NOTE: This shouldn't be an article as the word "list" is in the heading

The following is a list of notable current and past news anchors, correspondents, hosts, regular contributors and meteorologists from the Indian News channels NDTV, NDTV 24x7, NDTV India, NDTV Profit and NDTV Prime news networks.

Executives
 Prannoy Roy 
 Radhika Roy 
 Sonia Singh Editorial Director of NDTV and President of the NDTV Ethics Committee.

Current personalities
 Suparna Singh
 Ambika Anand
 Namrata Brar
 Appan Menon

News analysis hosts
 Sreenivasan Jain
 Vishnu Som

Series and specials hosts
 Prannoy Roy  
 Sonia Singh The NDTV Dialogues, India Decides,

Political and legal analysts
Shekhar Gupta

Political contributors

Security and foreign policy analysts

Former personalities 
Barkha Dutt
Nidhi Razdan
Vinod Dua
Vikram Chandra
Noopur Tiwari
Sunetra Choudhury
Pankaj Pachauri
Rajdeep Sardesai
Arnab Goswami
Punya Prasun Bajpai
Ravish Kumar

References

NDTV Personnel
NDTV people